In Slavic folklore, Baba Yaga, also spelled Baba Jaga (from Polish), is a supernatural being (or one of a trio of sisters of the same name) who appears as a deformed and/or ferocious-looking woman. In fairy tales Baba Yaga flies around in a mortar, wields a pestle, and dwells deep in the forest in a hut usually described as standing on chicken legs. Baba Yaga may help or hinder those who encounter or seek her out and may play a maternal role. She also has associations with forest wildlife. According to Vladimir Propp's folktale morphology, Baba Yaga commonly appears as either a  donor or a villain, or may be altogether ambiguous.

Dr. Andreas Johns identifies Baba Yaga as "one of the most memorable and distinctive figures in eastern European folklore", and observes that she is "enigmatic" and often exhibits "striking ambiguity". Johns summarizes Baba Yaga as "a many-faceted figure, capable of inspiring researchers to see her as a Cloud, Moon, Death, Winter, Snake, Bird, Pelican or Earth Goddess, totemic matriarchal ancestress, female initiator, phallic mother, or archetypal image".

Etymology 
Variations of the name Baba Yaga are found in many Slavic languages. The first element is a babble word which gives the word  (babusya or 'grandmother') or babusia in modern Ukrainian and Polish respectively,  (babushka or 'grandmother') in modern Russian, and babcia or babunia ('grandmother') in Polish. In Serbo-Croatian, Bosnian, Bulgarian and Romanian baba means 'grandmother' or 'old woman'. In contemporary Polish and Russian, baba is the pejorative synonym for 'woman', especially one that is old, dirty or foolish. As with other kinship terms in Slavic languages, baba may be used in other ways, potentially as a result of taboo; it may be applied to various animals, natural phenomena, and objects, such as types of mushrooms, cake or pears. In the Polesia region of Ukraine, the plural  may refer to an autumn funeral feast. The element may appear as a means of glossing the second element, iaga, with a familiar component or may have also been applied as a means of distinguishing Baba Yaga from a male counterpart.

Yaga is more etymologically problematic and there is no clear consensus among scholars about its meaning. In the 19th century, Alexander Afanasyev proposed the derivation of Proto-Slavic *ož and Sanskrit ahi ('serpent'). This etymology has been explored by 20th-century scholars. Related terms appear in Serbo-Croatian jeza ('horror', 'shudder', 'chill'), Slovene jeza ('anger'), Old Czech jězě ('witch', 'legendary evil female being'), modern Czech jezinka ('wicked wood nymph', 'dryad'), and Polish jędza ('witch', 'evil woman', 'fury'). The term appears in Old Church Slavonic as jęza/jędza ('disease'). In other Indo-European languages the element iaga has been linked to Lithuanian engti ('to abuse (continuously)', 'to belittle', 'to exploit'), Old English inca ('doubt', 'worry", 'pain'), and Old Norse ekki ('pain', 'worry').

Attestations 

The first clear reference to Baba Yaga occurs in 1755 in Mikhail V. Lomonosov's . In Lomonosov's grammar book, Baba Yaga is mentioned twice among other figures largely from Slavic tradition. The second of the two mentions occurs within a list of Slavic gods and beings next to their presumed equivalence in Roman mythology (the Slavic god Perun, for example, appears equated with the Roman god Jupiter). Baba Yaga, however, appears in a third section without an equivalence, highlighting her perceived uniqueness even in this first known attestation.

In the narratives in which Baba Yaga appears, she displays a variety of typical attributes: a turning, chicken-legged hut; and a mortar, pestle, and/or mop or broom. Her nose may stick into the ceiling. Particular emphasis may be placed by some narrators on the repulsiveness of her nose, breasts, buttocks, or vulva.

In some tales a trio of Baba Yagas appear as sisters, all sharing the same name. For example, in a version of "The Maiden Tsar" collected in the 19th century by Alexander Afanasyev, Ivan, a handsome merchant's son, makes his way to the home of one of three Baba Yagas:

Ivan walks for some time before encountering a small hut identical to the first. This Baba Yaga makes the same comments and asks the same question as the first, and Ivan asks the same question. This second Baba Yaga does not know either and directs him to the third, but says that if she gets angry with him "and wants to devour you, take three horns from her and ask her permission to blow them; blow the first one softly, the second one louder, and third still louder." Ivan thanks her and continues on his journey.

After walking for some time, Ivan eventually finds the chicken-legged hut of the youngest of the three sisters turning in an open field. This third and youngest of the Baba Yagas makes the same comment about "the Russian smell" before running to whet her teeth and consume Ivan. Ivan begs her to give him three horns and she does so. The first he blows softly, the second louder, and the third louder yet. This causes birds of all sorts to arrive and swarm the hut. One of the birds is the firebird, which tells him to hop on its back or Baba Yaga will eat him. He does so and the Baba Yaga rushes him and grabs the firebird by its tail. The firebird leaves with Ivan, leaving Baba Yaga behind with a fistful of firebird feathers.

In Afanasyev's collection of tales, Baba Yaga also appears in "Baba Yaga and Zamoryshek", "By Command of the Prince Daniel", "Vasilisa the Fair", "Marya Moryevna", "The Sea Tsar and Vasilisa the Wise", and "Legless Knight and Blind Knight" (English titles from Magnus's translation).

Depiction on  
In some instances, Baba Yaga appears astride a pig going to battle against a reptilian entity referred to as "crocodile".

Some scholars interpret this scene as a political parody. Peter the Great persecuted Old Believers, who in turn referred to him as a crocodile. A lubok that features Baba Yaga dancing with a bagpipe-playing bald man has been identified as a merrier depiction of the home life of Peter and Catherine. Alternately, some scholars have interpreted these  motifs as reflecting a concept of Baba Yaga as a shaman. The crocodile would in this case represent a monster who fights witches, and the print would be something of a "cultural mélange" that "demonstrate[s] an interest in shamanism at the time".

According to the Ph.D. dissertation of Andreas Johns, "Neither of these two interpretations significantly changes the image of Baba Yaga familiar from folktales. Either she can be seen as a literal evil witch, treated somewhat humorously in these prints, or as a figurative 'witch', an unpopular foreign empress. Both literal and figurative understandings of Baba Yaga are documented in the nineteenth century and were probably present at the time these prints were made."

Related figures and analogues 

, a figure closely related to Baba Yaga, occurs in the folklore of the West Slavic peoples. The two figures may originate from a common figure known during the Middle Ages or earlier; both figures are similarly ambiguous in character, but differ in appearance and the different tale types they occur in. Questions linger regarding the limited Slavic area—East Slavic nations, Slovakia, and the Czech lands—in which references to Ježibaba are recorded.  , another figure related to Baba Yaga, appears in Polish folklore.

Similarities between Baba Yaga and other beings in folklore may be due to either direct relation or cultural contact between the Eastern Slavs and other surrounding peoples. In Central and Eastern Europe, these figures include the Bulgarian gorska maika (Горска майка', 'Forest Mother', also the name of a flower); the Hungarian vasorrú bába ('Iron-nose Midwife'), the Serbian Baba Korizma, Gvozdenzuba ('Iron-tooth'), Baba Roga (used to scare children in Bosnia, Croatia, Montenegro, North Macedonia and Serbia), šumska majka ('Forest Mother'), and the babice; and the Slovenian jaga baba or ježibaba, Pehta or Pehtra baba and kvatrna baba or kvatrnica. In Romanian folklore, similarities have been identified in several figures, including Mama padurii ('Forest Mother') or Baba Cloanta referring to the nose as a bird's beak. In neighboring Germanic Europe, similarities have been observed between the Alpine Perchta and Holda or Holle in the folklore of Central and Northern Germany, and the Swiss Chlungeri.

Some scholars have proposed that the concept of Baba Yaga was influenced by East Slavic contact with Finno-Ugric and Siberian peoples. The "hut on chicken legs deep in the forest" plainly resembles huts raised on one or several stilts using stump with roots for the stilts, in popular use by Finno-Ugric peoples and also found in forests rather than villages. The stumps with roots may be uprooted and laid in a new place as in the example exhibited in Skansen, or in ground where it was felled. Like Baba Yaga's hut, these are normally cramped for a person, though unlike Baba Yaga's house they do not actively walk and also do not contain a stove, being intended as storehouses and not for living. The Karelian Syöjätär has some aspects of Baba Yaga, but only the negative ones, while in other Karelian tales, helpful roles akin to those from Baba Yaga may be performed by a character called  ('old woman').

In modern culture 

The character Valada Geloë, in Tad Williams' Memory, Sorrow, and Thorn trilogy, who is described as a "forest woman", has supernatural powers, can transform into a bird, and lives in a hut on a lake with bird feet which appears to move.

Voleth Meir, also known as the Deathless Mother in Season 2 of Netflix's The Witcher, is based on Baba Yaga.

Baba Yaga, appearing as a grotesque, child-eating witch, features as a prominent character in Hellboy comics franchise, including its 2019 film installment.

The film character John Wick is referred to by his enemies as "Baba Yaga", the name used synonymously with the term "bogeyman".

Dragon Ball character Fortuneteller Baba is based on Baba Yaga, as is fellow anime character Yubaba from Hayao Miyazaki's Spirited Away, while the titular object of Miyazaki's Howl's Moving Castle is modeled after her walking hut.

The ninth movement of Modest Mussorgsky's suite Pictures at an Exhibition is titled "The Hut on Hen's Legs (Baba Yaga)" and is inspired by a painting by Viktor Hartmann depicting the same.

Animated segments telling the story of Baba Yaga were used in the 2014 documentary The Vanquishing of the Witch Baba Yaga, directed by American filmmaker Jessica Oreck.

In the animated movie Bartok the Magnificent (1998) by Fox Studios, Baba Yaga is portrayed as a false antagonist who gives Bartok quests to save the Czar of Russia.

The 1989 PC game Quest for Glory: So You Want to Be a Hero has the player undo curses cast by Baba Yaga, who serves as a main antagonist in the title.

She is a playable magical character in the 2014 video game Smite.

Orson Scott Card’s 1999 fantasy novel Enchantment features Baba Yaga as the arch-villainess, in this modern take on the Ukrainian version of Sleeping Beauty.

The track "Baba Yaga" was released August 2021, on Russian metal band Slaughter to Prevail's album Kostolom.

See also 
 Morana (goddess)
 Babay, a night spirit in Slavic folklore who is also useful in scaring children.
 Hansel and Gretel
 Despoina / Persephone
 Hecate
 The Morrígan
 Yama-uba, a similar character to Baba Yaga, in Japanese folklore.
 Izanami
 Pictures at an Exhibition (Emerson, Lake & Palmer album), "The Hut of Baba Yaga" (Pt. 1 and 2), "The Curse of Baba Yaga", or movements 8, 10, and 9.

Citations

Cited and general sources

External links 

 Baba Yaga: The greatest 'wicked witch' of all?, BBC

 
Fairy tale stock characters
Female characters in fairy tales
Fictional characters introduced in 1755
Fictional witches
Mythological anthropophages
Russian folklore characters
Slavic folklore characters
Women in Russian mythology

az:Çax